Đăk Hà is a rural district of Kon Tum province in the Central Highlands region of Vietnam.

Divisions
Dak Ha contains the following communes:

Đăk La
Hà Mòn
Ngọc Wang
Ngọc Réo
Đăk Uy
Đăk Mar
Đăk Hring
Đăk Pxi

As of 2003 the district had a population of 53,684. The district covers an area of 844 km². The district capital lies at Đăk Hà.

References

Districts of Kon Tum province